Vasek Pospisil and Jack Sock were the defending champions, but lost in the final to Pierre-Hugues Herbert and Nicolas Mahut, 3–6, 6–7(5–7).

Seeds

Draw

Finals

Top half

Bottom half

References
Main Draw

2016 BNP Paribas Open